Ramyah    is a village in the  Bint Jbeil District in southern Lebanon.

Name
According to E. H. Palmer in 1881,  Ramia comes from a personal name.

History
In  the 1596 tax records, it was named as a village,  Ramiya, in the Ottoman nahiya (subdistrict) of Tibnin  under the liwa' (district) of Safad, with a population of  49  households and 4 bachelors, all Muslim. The villagers paid a fixed  tax-rate of 25%  on  agricultural products, such as wheat, barley, olive trees, fruit trees, goats and beehives, in addition to  "occasional revenues" and a press for olive oil or grape syrup; a total of 3,966 akçe.

In 1852,  Edward Robinson noted here: "We came upon an ancient sarcophagus at the foot of the hill, and saw others on the way up. On the top near the village are two very large ones. One of the lids measured 7 1/2 feet long by 2 feet broad, with nearly the same thickness. In a field below our tent, about midway of the hill-side, were others of an unusual character. In a large isolated rock were excavated no less than three sarcophagi, side by side ; and then the exterior of the rock was hewn away, and the corners rounded oft. Around each sarcophagus a ledge was left for a corresponding groove in the lid. The whole is a striking monument of antiquity."

In 1875, Victor Guérin found here a great sarcophagus cut in an enormous block, the lower part not yet detached from the rock, containing three receptacles for bodies. The lids were missing. Here are also several rock-cut tombs, one of which, examined by Guérin, was found to contain three loculi.

In 1881, the PEF's Survey of Western Palestine (SWP)  described it:  "A small stone village, containing about 150 Moslems, situated on a hill-top in the valley, with a few figs, olives, and arable land; the valley to the west turns into a swamp in winter, owing to having no drainage; there are cisterns and a large birket for water supply." They further noted "Several large sarcophagi round this village, and one olive-press."

See also
Battle of Ayta ash-Shab
Belat temple

References

Bibliography

  

 

 (van der Velde, 1858, p. 342)

External links
 Ramiyeh (Bent Jbayl), Localiban
Survey of Western Palestine, Map 4: IAA, Wikimedia commons

Populated places in the Israeli security zone 1985–2000
Populated places in Bint Jbeil District